Dean House or Dean Farm may refer to:

Scotland
Dean House, Edinburgh, near Edinburgh in 1594 and in or near modern Edinburgh, site of incident involving Provost of Edinburgh Alexander Home of North Berwick

United States 
(by state)

Dean House (Portland, Arkansas), listed on the National Register of Historic Places (NRHP)
Dean House (Texarkana, Arkansas), NRHP-listed
Abiezar Dean House, Taunton, MA, NRHP-listed
Dr. Edgar Everett Dean House, Brockton, MA, NRHP-listed
Frank L. and Mabel H. Dean House, Worcester, MA, NRHP-listed
George Dean House, Taunton, MA, NRHP-listed
Jonathan Dean House, Taunton, MA, NRHP-listed
Lloyd Dean House, Taunton, MA, NRHP-listed
Mary Dean Three-Decker, Worcester, MA, NRHP-listed
Silas Dean House, Stoneham, MA, NRHP-listed
Theodore Dean House, Taunton, MA, NRHP-listed
Dean-Barstow House, Taunton, MA, NRHP-listed
Dean-Hartshorn House, Taunton, MA, NRHP-listed
A.J. Dean House, Kalispell, MT, NRHP-listed
Dean Farm (Louisburg, North Carolina), NRHP-listed
Anna-Dean Farm, Barberton, OH, NRHP-listed
Dean Family Farm, Jamestown, OH, NRHP-listed
Dean Family Farm Historic District, Xenia, OH, NRHP-listed
James Heber Dean House, Beaver, UT, NRHP-listed
Nathaniel W. Dean House, Madison, WI, NRHP-listed
Agricultural Dean's House, Madison, WI, NRHP-listed
Erastus Dean Farmstead, Janesville, WI, NRHP-listed

See also
Deane House (disambiguation)